Tonga is a sovereign state in Polynesia that wholly utilises UTC+13:00 year round. Tonga does not currently observe daylight saving time, though they did in the Southern Hemisphere summers between 1992 and 2002 as well as the 2016—2017 summer, utilising UTC+14:00. UTC+14:00 is the earliest time zone on Earth and so, when using daylight saving time, Tonga was one of the first regions of Earth to bring in a new year. UTC+14:00 is also used by Samoa and Kiribati's Line Islands. Tonga currently shares a year-round time zone with Tokelau and the Phoenix Islands whilst Fiji, New Zealand and Samoa share Tonga's time seasonally. Tonga is west of the International Date Line (IDL) which deviates east from its standard course following the 180th meridian to roughly the 165th meridian west to traverse east of Tonga and other surrounding land.

References